Tambet is an Estonian masculine given name. Individuals bearing the name Tambet include:
Tambet Pikkor (born 1980), Estonian ski jumper
Tambet Tampuu (born 1963), Estonian lawyer and a judge
Tambet Tuisk (born 1976), Estonian actor

References

Masculine given names
Estonian masculine given names